The World RX of Italy is a Rallycross event held in Italy for the FIA World Rallycross Championship. The event made its debut in the 2014 season, at the Franciacorta International Circuit in the town of Franciacorta, Lombardy.

Past winners

References

External links

Italy
Auto races in Italy